Bonetta may refer to:

 Sara Forbes Bonetta (1843–1880) a West African Egbado princess of the Yoruba people 
 Bonetta-class sloop, a class of three sloops-of war built for the Royal Navy between 1755 and 1756
 Bonetta group sloop, a batch of eight sloops-of war built for the Royal Navy during 1732

See also 
  – any one of 13 vessels of the British Royal Navy
 Bonetti (disambiguation)